The Extended Cold Weather Clothing System (ECWCS ) is a protective clothing system developed in the 1980s by the United States Army Natick Soldier Research, Development and Engineering Center, Natick, Massachusetts. The first generation ECWCS consisted of parka and trousers plus 20 other individual clothing, handwear, headwear and footwear items which are used in various combinations to meet the cold weather environmental requirements of the US military (and others). The Extended Climate Warfighter Clothing System, or Gen III ECWCS, is designed to maintain adequate environmental protection in temperatures ranging between -60 and +40 Fahrenheit (about -51 and +4 Celsius)

1st Generation
The entire ECWCS ensemble (1st generation) consists of:

 undershirt, cold weather, polypropylene 
 [drawers], cold weather, polypropylene
 shirt, cold weather, polyester fiberpile
 overall, bib, cold weather, fiberpile
 liner, cold weather trousers, field
 liner, cold weather, coat, men's
 trousers, cold weather, field, nylon and cotton
 parka, extended cold weather, camouflage
 trousers, extended cold weather, camouflage
 parka/trousers, snow camouflage, white
 glove inserts, cold weather
 gloves, men's and women's, light duty
 mitten inserts, cold weather, (trigger finger)
 mitten shells, cold weather, (trigger finger)
 mitten set, extreme cold weather
 mitten shells, snow camouflage, cotton, white, two finger
 cap, camouflage pattern
 hood, balaclava
 socks, men's, nylon, cushion sole, stretch type
 boots, cold weather (Type I-black)
 boots, extreme cold weather (Type II-white)
 suspenders, trousers, M-1950 

The system is to be used in an insulated, triple-layering fashion, with the polypropylene undergarments as Layer 1, the polyester shirt/bib, liners and cotton/nylon trousers as Layer 2, and Gore-Tex outer garments as Layer 3.

The parka and trousers (which have been adapted to the civilian outdoor clothing market) are themselves constructed in a three-layer fashion consisting of an outer layer of abrasion-resistant taslan nylon, an intermediate layer of durably waterproof, windproof, and Gore-Tex membrane (protected with a layer of nylon tricot and originally in a four-color camouflage print), and a hung inner layer of unlaminated nylon. The whole is seam-sealed.

The ECWCS parka
The parka – which is a particularly popular component – is characterized by a cobra hood (which fits over a combat helmet) with woven nylon drawstring adjustable pulls and an attachment piece that allows fastening of a fur ruff (early models of the parka lacked this attachment piece). There is a two-way, full-front slide fastener to provide full-face protection, leaving only the eyes uncovered. The parka has Raglan shoulders/sleeves, a non-freezing, double-pull zipper with storm flap and seven snap closure, a flap-covered pocket on the left sleeve with hook and loop (Velcro) closure, adjustable hook and loop wrist cuffs, armpit ventilation zippers and double reinforced elbows. A badge/insignia tab with snap is located on the storm flap. There is an interior back ventilation opening, two slash (handwarmer) cargo pockets on the lower front (with extra large flaps and double hook and loop single snap closure on each) and an inside draft skirt (windskirt) with elastic drawcords and barrel-locks at the waist (without pulls). There are also two concealed map pockets at the front zipper with hook and loop closures that can be opened without unzipping the parka.

2nd Generation
The second generation (2G) ECWCS included two different layers made with Polartec fabrics: the Polartec Classic 300 shirt and the Polartec Classic 200 overalls. When used in combination with other layers in the ECWCS system, the system provides protection between +40 °F and −40 °F (+4 °C and −40 °C).  The parka was improved by vents to help deal with the condensation problems resulting from the use of "waterproof-breathable" fabric.

A lightweight underwear set was also introduced to combine with or substitute the polypro undergarments.

3rd Generation
The third generation 3G or GEN III Extended Climate Warfighter Clothing System  is a radical re-design of the system. It features seven new layers of insulation including three Polartec fabrics:  two layers of Polartec Power Dry and a layer of Polartec Thermal Pro High Loft. It has also featured PrimaLoft® Silver Insulation USA in the extreme cold weather parka and trousers. The 12 components of the GEN III ECWCS include:

 lightweight undershirt and drawers
 midweight shirt and drawers
 fleece cold weather jacket
 wind cold weather jacket
 soft shell jacket and trousers
 extreme cold/wet weather jacket and trousers
 extreme cold weather parka and trousers

Initial fielding of the system began in August 2007 to the 73rd Cavalry Regiment in Afghanistan.

The water-resistant "soft shell" is far more breathable than any "waterproof-breathable" garment and is used for most field applications, back-stopped by a waterproof nylon parka.

Levels of Protection
Level I: Sandy-colored Light-Weight polypropylene Polartec Power Dry Silkweight Undershirt & Drawers
Level II: Sandy polyester Polartec Power Dry grid fleece Mid-Weight Shirt & Drawers
Level III: Black Polartec Thermal Pro® polyester High-Loft Fleece Jacket
Level IV: Nylon Wind Jacket
Level V: Water-repellent stretchable nylon soft shell Cold Weather Jacket & Trousers
Level VI: Extreme Wet/Cold Weather Gore-Tex Jacket & Trousers
Level VII: Extreme Cold Weather soft shell with PrimaLoft® Silver Insulation USA Parka & Trousers

Total weight: 12.82 lbs / 5.82kg

References

Sources
United States Army Natick Soldier Research, Development and Engineering Center, Natick, MA, Use and Care of the Extended Cold Weather Clothing System (ECWCS), January 1986.
"ADS Operational Equipment"

External links
 Extended Cold Weather Clothing System (ECWCS) Factsheet
 ECWCS information
 Generation III
 Extended Cold Weather Clothing System (ECWCS) Factsheet

United States military uniforms
United States Army uniforms
Military equipment introduced in the 1980s